Luigi Conti (born 11 September 1937) is a retired Italian long-distance runner.

Biography
He finished 12th in the 5000 metres event of the 1960 Summer Olympics. He was born in Rancio in the Province of Como and ran for the Centro Sportivo Esercito military sports club. He also represented his nation at the 1966 European Athletics Championships, where he ran in the marathon, but failed to finish.

He was a five-time national champion at the Italian Athletics Championships, winning the 5000 m in 1959, 1960 and 1963, as well as the 10,000 metres in 1960 and 1963. He also won the Italian cross country running title in 1962 and 1965. He held a personal best of 14:01.55 minutes for the 5000 m.

References

External links
 

1937 births
Living people
Sportspeople from the Province of Como
Italian male cross country runners
Italian male long-distance runners
Italian male marathon runners
Olympic athletes of Italy
Athletes (track and field) at the 1960 Summer Olympics